Guiffy SureMerge is a data comparison utility. In addition to comparing files, the program is capable of doing side-by-side comparison of directories and archives.

The program is also capable of performing automatic 3-way file merges.  It is available for Windows, Mac OS, Linux, and Unix operating systems.

Reception 
In December 2002 Guiffy SureMerge was awarded five out of five Cows by Tucows on all 3 platforms (Windows, Mac, and Linux). Scott Swedorski, editor-in-chief and founder of Tucows, said, "To our knowledge, Guiffy is the first multi-platform application to receive 5 Cows for all versions."

In June 2006 Guiffy Suremerge received the Jolt Productivity Award. Rick Wayne, a Jolt Award judge, said, "Guiffy Software's SureMerge uses an advanced set of three-way merge algorithms to detect potentially dangerous conflicts other tools might miss."

In a November 2008 review, Guiffy SureMerge was awarded five out of five stars by CNET. The reviewers found Guiffy SureMerge to be a "tool with serious muscle and a much easier, more intuitive interface than you'll find on any freeware package".

Features 
 Automatic 3-way file merge 
 Highlight the differences within the line
 Compare views saved as reports (in HTML)
 Support for ASCII, MBCS, Unicode character encoding and editing
 Syntax highlighting
 Ignore of case, white space, comments, regular expressions
 Folder compare of file trees with explorer expand/collapse interface
 Folder compares of archive files (.zip, .tar, .jar and several variants)
 64 bit supports file diff/merge > 2GB
 Image diff tool
 Binary diff tool
 Command line interfaces
 Java API 
 Eclipse and NetBeans plugins
 Shell (desktop) integration on Windows, Mac OS X, and Linux
 SCM integrations including: Perforce, Git, and Subversion

See also 
Diff
Comparison of file comparison tools
Merge (revision control)

References

External links 
Guiffy Software Inc. website

File comparison tools